The 2018–19 Charlotte Hornets season was the 29th season of the franchise in the National Basketball Association (NBA). On April 13, 2018, the Hornets fired head coach Steve Clifford after the team missed the playoffs. On May 10, 2018, the Hornets hired James Borrego as head coach. This season is notable because the team is celebrating their 30th year in the NBA, also announcing that Muggsy Bogues and Dell Curry would be ambassadors for the team. With a Detroit Pistons win on April 10, against the New York Knicks, the Hornets were eliminated from playoff contention for the third straight season.

This season also marked Tony Parker's 18th and final season in the NBA, as he announced his retirement on June 10, 2019. As the last remaining active player from the Spurs Big 3, this season was Parker's first missing the playoffs and he was also the last remaining active player from the Spurs' 2003, 2005, and 2007 championship teams. Parker's retirement also left Rajon Rondo of the Los Angeles Lakers and Udonis Haslem and Dwyane Wade of the Miami Heat as the last remaining active players to win championships in the 2000s.

After 8 years, this season marked the end of the Kemba Walker era in Charlotte as he joined the Boston Celtics during the following summer.

NBA draft

Roster

<noinclude>

Game log

Preseason

|- style="background:#bfb"
| 1
| September 28
| Boston
| 
| Lamb (15)
| Kidd-Gilchrist (12)
| Batum (6)
| Dean Smith Center18,081
| 1–0
|- style="background:#fbb"
| 2
| September 30
| @ Boston
| 
| Bridges (23)
| Kaminsky (7)
| Batum, Lamb, Monk (4)
| TD Garden18,624
| 1–1
|- style="background:#bfb;"
| 3
| October 2
| Miami
| 
| Walker (18)
| Hernangómez (10)
| Parker, Monk (7)
| Spectrum Center8,417
| 2–1
|- style="background:#bfb;"
| 4
| October 8
| Chicago
| 
| Walker (20)
| Batum (12)
| Batum (7)
| Spectrum Center8,487
| 3–1
|- style="background:#bfb;"
| 5
| October 12
| @ Dallas
| 
| Graham (15)
| Bridges (7)
| Monk (5)
| American Airlines Center18,745
| 4–1

Regular season

|- style="background:#fcc;"
| 1
| October 17
| Milwaukee
| 
| Kemba Walker (41)
| Marvin Williams (9)
| Tony Parker (7)
| Spectrum Center17,889
| 0–1
|- style="background:#cfc;"
| 2
| October 19
| @ Orlando
| 
| Kemba Walker (26)
| Michael Kidd-Gilchrist (9)
| Tony Parker (6)
| Amway Center17,668
| 1–1
|- style="background:#cfc;"
| 3
| October 20
| @ Miami
| 
| Kemba Walker (39)
| Cody Zeller (8)
| Kemba Walker (7)
| American Airlines Arena19,600
| 2–1
|- style="background:#fcc;"
| 4
| October 22
| @ Toronto
| 
| Kemba Walker (26)
| Kemba Walker (5)
| Kemba Walker (5)
| Scotiabank Arena19,800
| 2–2
|- style="background:#fcc;"
| 5
| October 24
| @ Chicago
| 
| Kemba Walker (23)
| Marvin Williams (8)
| Kemba Walker (6)
| United Center19,170
| 2–3
|- style="background:#cfc;"
| 6
| October 26
| Chicago
| 
| Kemba Walker (30)
| Michael Kidd-Gilchrist (8)
| Tony Parker (8)
| Spectrum Center15,220
| 3–3
|- style="background:#fcc;"
| 7
| October 27
| @ Philadelphia
| 
| Kemba Walker (37)
| Nicolas Batum (10)
| Kemba Walker (6)
| Wells Fargo Center20,203
| 3–4
|- style="background:#cfc;"
| 8
| October 30
| Miami
| 
| Tony Parker (24)
| Kidd-Gilchrist, Hernangómez (8)
| Tony Parker (11)
| Spectrum Center14,117
| 4–4

|- style="background:#fcc;"
| 9
| November 1
| Oklahoma City
| 
| Kemba Walker (21)
| Kidd-Gilchrist, Lamb (9)
| Kemba Walker (6)
| Spectrum Center14,583
| 4–5
|- style="background:#cfc;"
| 10
| November 3
| Cleveland
| 
| Jeremy Lamb (19)
| Jeremy Lamb (8)
| Nicolas Batum (8)
| Spectrum Center16,221
| 5–5
|- style="background:#cfc;"
| 11
| November 6
| Atlanta
| 
| Kemba Walker (29)
| Willy Hernangómez (9)
| Kemba Walker (7)
| Spectrum Center13,955
| 6–5
|-style="background:#fcc;"
| 12
| November 9
| @ Philadelphia
| 
| Kemba Walker (30)
| Michael Kidd-Gilchrist (12)
| Kemba Walker (8)
| Wells Fargo Center20,424
| 6–6
|-style="background:#cfc;"
| 13
| November 11
| @ Detroit
| 
| Walker, Parker (24)
| Batum, Bridges (8)
| Kemba Walker (8)
| Little Caesars Arena15,133
| 7–6
|-style="background:#fcc;"
| 14
| November 13
| @ Cleveland
| 
| Jeremy Lamb (22)
| Jeremy Lamb (6)
| Kemba Walker (6)
| Quicken Loans Arena19,432
| 7–7
|-style="background:#fcc;"
| 15
| November 17
| Philadelphia
| 
| Kemba Walker (60)
| Jeremy Lamb (10)
| Tony Parker (5)
| Spectrum Center19,426
|7–8
|-style="background:#cfc;"
| 16
| November 19
| Boston
| 
| Kemba Walker (43)
| Batum, Zeller (8)
| Kemba Walker (5)
| Spectrum Center18,040
| 8–8
|-style="background:#cfc;"
| 17
| November 21
| Indiana
| 
| Jeremy Lamb (21)
| Jeremy Lamb (7)
| Kemba Walker (11)
| Spectrum Center15,913
| 9–8
|-style="background:#fcc;"
| 18
| November 23
| @ Oklahoma City
| 
| Kemba Walker (25)
| Nicolas Batum (9)
| Kemba Walker (8)
| Chesapeake Energy Arena18,203
| 9–9
|-style="background:#fcc;"
| 19
| November 25
| @ Atlanta
| 
| Malik Monk (26)
| Marvin Williams (13)
| Kemba Walker (9)
| State Farm Arena12,977
| 9–10
|-style="background:#cfc;"
| 20
| November 26
| Milwaukee
| 
| Lamb, Walker (21)
| Lamb, Williams (8)
| Tony Parker (6)
| Spectrum Center13,805
| 10–10
|-style="background:#cfc;"
| 21
| November 28
| Atlanta
| 
| Jeremy Lamb (22)
| Batum, Kaminsky, Williams (6)
| Batum, Parker, Walker (3)
| Spectrum Center12,971
| 11–10
|-style="background:#fcc
| 22
| November 30
| Utah
| 
| Jeremy Lamb (24)
| Marvin Williams (11)
| Tony Parker (9)
| Spectrum Center15,812
| 11–11

|- style="background:#fcc;"
| 23
| December 2
| New Orleans
| 
| Frank Kaminsky (19)
| Bridges, Hernangómez (8)
| Parker, Walker (5)
| Spectrum Center15,336
| 11–12
|- style="background:#fcc;"
| 24
| December 5
| @ Minnesota
| 
| Lamb, Batum (18)
| Jeremy Lamb (11)
| Parker, Walker (5)
| Target Center11,248
| 11–13
|- style="background:#cfc;"
| 25
| December 7
| Denver
| 
| Kemba Walker (21)
| Marvin Williams (10)
| Kemba Walker (8)
| Spectrum Center13,755
| 12–13
|- style="background:#cfc;"
| 26
| December 9
| @ New York
| 
| Kemba Walker (25)
| Cody Zeller (7)
| Kemba Walker (6)
| Madison Square Garden18,602
| 13–13
|- style="background:#cfc;"
| 27
| December 12
| Detroit
| 
| Kemba Walker (31)
| Marvin Williams (10)
| Kemba Walker (9)
| Spectrum Center13,997
| 14–13
|- style="background:#fcc;"
| 28
| December 14
| New York
| 
| Butum, Zeller (21)
| Cody Zeller (13)
| Kemba Walker (10)
| Spectrum Center17,622
| 14–14
|- style="background:#fcc;"
| 29
| December 15
| L.A. Lakers
| 
| Malik Monk (19)
| Cody Zeller (7)
| Devonte' Graham (6)
| Spectrum Center19,641
| 14–15
|- style="background:#cfc;"
| 30
| December 19
| Cleveland
| 
| Kemba Walker (30)
| Jeremy Lamb (11)
| Kemba Walker (6)
| Spectrum Center15,179
| 15–15
|- style="background:#cfc;"
| 31
| December 21
| Detroit
| 
| Marvin Williams (24)
| Cody Zeller (8)
| Kemba Walker (5)
| Spectrum Center15,812
| 16–15
|- style="background:#fcc;"
| 32
| December 23
| @ Boston
| 
| Kemba Walker (21)
| Willy Hernangómez (10)
| Jeremy Lamb (5)
| TD Garden18,624
| 16–16
|- style="background:#fcc;"
| 33
| December 26
| @ Brooklyn
| 
| Kemba Walker (25)
| Marvin Williams (12)
| Parker, Walker (5)
| Barclays Center14,309
| 16–17
|- style="background:#cfc;"
| 34
| December 28
| Brooklyn
| 
| Kemba Walker (29)
| Cody Zeller (10)
| Nicolas Batum (5)
| Spectrum Center19,411
| 17–17
|- style="background:#fcc;"
| 35
| December 29
| @ Washington
| 
| Kemba Walker (47)
| Cody Zeller (9)
| Devonte' Graham (5)
| Capital One Arena17,197
| 17–18
|- style="background:#cfc;"
| 36
| December 31
| Orlando
| 
| Kemba Walker (24)
| Willy Hernangómez (8)
| Kemba Walker (7)
| Spectrum Center14,694
| 18–18

|- style="background:#fcc;"
| 37
| January 2
| Dallas
| 
| Kemba Walker (11)
| Willy Hernangómez (10)
| Kemba Walker (5)
| Spectrum Center16,955
| 18–19
|- style="background:#fcc;"
| 38
| January 5
| @ Denver
| 
| Kemba Walker (20)
| Bismack Biyombo (12)
| Devonte' Graham (5)
| Pepsi Center19,861
| 18–20
|- style="background:#cfc;"
| 39
| January 6
| @ Phoenix
| 
| Kemba Walker (29)
| Willy Hernangómez (9)
| Tony Parker (6)
| Talking Stick Resort Arena13,110
| 19–20
|- style="background:#fcc;"
| 40
| January 8
| @ L.A. Clippers
| 
| Malik Monk (24)
| Marvin Williams (7)
| Kemba Walker (5)
| Staples Center15,275
| 19–21
|- style="background:#fcc;"
| 41
| January 11
| @ Portland
| 
| Kemba Walker (18)
| Biyombo, Hernangómez (8)
| Malik Monk (4)
| Moda Center19,393
| 19–22
|- style="background:#fcc;"
| 42
| January 12
| @ Sacramento
| 
| Kemba Walker (31)
| Bismack Biyombo (10)
| Nicolas Batum (5)
| Golden 1 Center17,853
| 19–23
|- style="background:#cfc;"
| 43
| January 14
|  @ San Antonio
| 
| Kemba Walker (33)
| Lamb, Kidd-Gilchrist (7)
| Kemba Walker (5)
| AT&T Center18,354
| 20–23
|- style="background:#cfc;"
| 44
| January 17
|  Sacramento
| 
| Kemba Walker (23)
| Willy Hernangómez (16)
| Tony Parker (6)
| Spectrum Center15,431
| 21–23
|- style="background:#cfc;"
| 45
| January 19
| Phoenix
| 
| Kemba Walker (21)
| Biyombo, Hernangómez (13)
| Batum, Lamb (6)
| Spectrum Center19,278
| 22–23
|- style="background:#fcc;"
| 46
| January 20
|  @ Indiana
|  
| Kemba Walker (23)
| Bismack Biyombo (12)
| Kemba Walker (7)
| Bankers Life Fieldhouse15,015
| 22–24
|- style="background:#cfc;"
| 47
| January 23
| @ Memphis
| 
| Kemba Walker (22)
| Bismack Biyombo (10)
| Kemba Walker (7)
| FedExForum12,863
| 23–24
|- style="background:#fcc;"
| 48
| January 25
| @ Milwaukee
| 
| Nicolas Batum (19)
| Walker, Williams (8)
| Kemba Walker (5)
| Fiserv Forum17,803
| 23–25
|- style="background:#cfc;"
| 49
| January 28
| New York
| 
| Lamb, Parker (15)
| Willy Hernangómez (11)
| Kemba Walker (5)
| Spectrum Center13,963
| 24–25
|- style="background:#fcc;"
| 50
| January 30
| @ Boston
| 
| Kemba Walker (21)
| Biyombo, Lamb (5)
| Nicolas Batum (4)
| TD Garden18,624
| 24–26

|- style="background:#cfc;"
| 51
| February 1
| Memphis
| 
| Kemba Walker (23)
| Nicolas Batum (10)
| Tony Parker (7)
| Spectrum Center15,387
| 25–26
|- style="background:#cfc;"
| 52
| February 2
| Chicago
| 
| Kemba Walker (37)
| Jeremy Lamb (9)
| Kemba Walker (10)
| Spectrum Center19,114
| 26–26
|- style="background:#fcc;"
| 53
| February 5
| L.A. Clippers
| 
| Kemba Walker (32)
| Cody Zeller (11)
| Kemba Walker (9)
| Spectrum Center14,300
| 26–27
|- style="background:#fcc;"
| 54
| February 6
| @ Dallas
| 
| Kemba Walker (30)
| Cody Zeller (13)
| Kemba Walker (6)
| American Airlines Center19,606
| 26–28
|- style="background:#cfc;"
| 55
| February 9
| @ Atlanta
| 
| Kemba Walker (37)
| Cody Zeller (8)
| Nicolas Batum (8)
| State Farm Arena15,048
| 27–28
|- style="background:#fcc;"
| 56
| February 11
| @ Indiana
| 
| Kemba Walker (34)
| Marvin Williams (11)
| Batum, Walker, Zeller (3)
| Bankers Life Fieldhouse15,734
| 27–29
|- style="background:#fcc;"
| 57
| February 14
| @ Orlando
| 
| Malik Monk (15)
| Marvin Williams (8)
| Devonte' Graham (4)
| Amway Center18,846
| 27–30
|- style="background:#cfc;"
| 58
| February 22
| Washington
| 
| Kemba Walker (27)
| Williams, Zeller (9)
| Kemba Walker (11)
| Spectrum Center15,572
| 28–30
|- style="background:#fcc;"
| 59
| February 23
| Brooklyn
| 
| Kemba Walker (32)
| Cody Zeller (11)
| Tony Parker (5)
| Spectrum Center19,158
| 28–31
|- style="background:#fcc;"
| 60
| February 25
| Golden State
| 
| Cody Zeller (28)
| Cody Zeller (9)
| Jeremy Lamb (7)
| Spectrum Center19,419
| 28–32
|- style="background:#fcc;"
| 61
| February 27
| Houston
| 
| Kemba Walker (35)
| Jeremy Lamb (14)
| Batum, Lamb (6)
| Spectrum Center17,903
| 28–33

|- style="background:#cfc;"
| 62
| March 1
| @ Brooklyn
| 
| Kemba Walker (25)
| Cody Zeller (9)
| Kemba Walker (7)
| Barclays Center15,578
| 29–33
|- style="background:#fcc;"
| 63
| March 3
| Portland
| 
| Jeremy Lamb (23)
| Bismack Biyombo (9)
| Kemba Walker (12)
| Spectrum Center18,355
| 29–34
|- style="background:#fcc;"
| 64
| March 6
| Miami
| 
| Kaminsky, Walker (20)
| Cody Zeller (10)
| Kemba Walker (7)
| Spectrum Center18,137
| 29–35
|- style="background:#cfc;"
| 65
| March 8
| Washington
| 
| Marvin Williams (30)
| Jeremy Lamb (10)
| Kemba Walker (6)
| Spectrum Center18,144
| 30–35
|- style="background:#fcc;"
| 66
| March 9
| @ Milwaukee
| 
| Kemba Walker (25)
| Batum, M. Williams (8)
| Batum, Kaminsky, Walker (4)
| Fiserv Forum17,966
| 30–36
|- style="background:#fcc;"
| 67
| March 11
| @ Houston
| 
| Kemba Walker (40)
| Kemba Walker (10)
| Kemba Walker (7)
| Toyota Center18,055
| 30–37
|- style="background:#cfc;"
| 68
| March 15
| @ Washington
| 
| Kemba Walker (28)
| Jeremy Lamb (8)
| Nicolas Batum (6)
| Capital One Arena19,520
| 31–37
|- style="background:#fcc;"
| 69
| March 17
| @ Miami
| 
| Jeremy Lamb (21)
| Batum, Kaminsky (7)
| Kemba Walker (4)
| American Airlines Arena19,600
| 31–38
|- style="background:#fcc;"
| 70
| March 19
| Philadelphia
| 
| Jeremy Lamb (26)
| Jeremy Lamb (11)
| Kemba Walker (4)
| Spectrum Center16,411
| 31–39
|- style="background:#cfc;"
| 71
| March 21
| Minnesota
| 
| Kemba Walker (31)
| Miles Bridges (12)
| Kemba Walker (6)
| Spectrum Center15,576
| 32–39
|- style="background:#cfc;"
| 72
| March 23
| Boston
| 
| Kemba Walker (36)
| Kemba Walker (11)
| Kemba Walker (9)
| Spectrum Center19,438
| 33–39
|- style="background:#cfc;"
| 73
| March 24
| @ Toronto
| 
| Dwayne Bacon (24)
| Willy Hernangómez (10)
| Kemba Walker (13)
| Scotiabank Arena19,800
| 34–39
|- style="background:#cfc;"
| 74
| March 26
| San Antonio
| 
| Kemba Walker (38)
| Frank Kaminsky (10)
| Kemba Walker (11)
| Spectrum Center14,227
| 35–39
|- style="background:#fcc;"
| 75
| March 29
| @ L.A. Lakers
| 
| Kemba Walker (24)
| Bismack Biyombo (9)
| Kemba Walker (6)
| Staples Center18,997
| 35–40
|- style="background:#fcc;"
| 76
| March 31
| @ Golden State
| 
| Willy Hernangómez (22)
| Hernangómez, Bridges (5)
| Jeremy Lamb (5)
| Oracle Arena19,596
| 35–41

|- style="background:#fcc;"
| 77
| April 1
| @ Utah
| 
| Kemba Walker (47)
| Willy Hernangómez (8)
| Devonte' Graham (6)
| Vivint Smart Home Arena18,306
| 35–42
|- style="background:#cfc;"
| 78
| April 3
| @ New Orleans
| 
| Kemba Walker (32)
| Bismack Biyombo (9)
| Kemba Walker (7)
| Smoothie King Center16,844
| 36–42
|- style="background:#cfc;"
| 79
| April 5
| Toronto
| 
| Kemba Walker (29)
| Frank Kaminsky (13)
| Kemba Walker (8)
| Spectrum Center18,684
| 37–42
|- style="background:#cfc;"
| 80
| April 7
| @ Detroit
| 
| Kemba Walker (31)
| Bismack Biyombo (9)
| Kemba Walker (7)
| Little Caesars Arena19,871
| 38–42
|- style="background:#cfc;"
| 81
| April 9
| @ Cleveland
| 
| Walker, Lamb (23)
| Miles Bridges (7)
| Kemba Walker (7)
| Rocket Mortgage FieldHouse19,432
| 39–42
|- style="background:#fcc;"
| 82
| April 10
| Orlando
| 
| Kemba Walker (43)
| Jeremy Lamb (8)
| Kemba Walker (5)
| Spectrum Center17,719
| 39–43

Standings

Player statistics

|-
| align="left"| || align="center"| SG
| 43 || 13 || 759 || 89 || 47 || 12 || 5 || 316
|-
| align="left"| || align="center"| SF
| 75 || 72 || 2,354 || 390 || 247 || 71 || 43 || 699
|-
| align="left"| || align="center"| C
| 54 || 32 || 783 || 247 || 33 || 11 || 41 || 236
|-
| align="left"| || align="center"| SF
| 80 || 25 || 1,696 || 323 || 95 || 55 || 49 || 597
|-
| align="left"| || align="center"| PG
| 1 || 0 || 8 || 0 || 1 || 0 || 0 || 2
|-
| align="left"| || align="center"| PG
| 46 || 3 || 676 || 63 || 121 || 23 || 2 || 217
|-
| align="left"| || align="center"| C
| 58 || 3 || 812 || 311 || 60 || 16 || 20 || 421
|-
| align="left"| || align="center"| C
| 47 || 0 || 755 || 163 || 63 || 12 || 12 || 405
|-
| align="left"| || align="center"| PF
| 64 || 3 || 1,179 || 246 || 61 || 32 || 39 || 427
|-
| align="left"| || align="center"| SG
| 79 || 55 || 2,250 || style=";"|434 || 172 || 88 || 32 || 1,208
|-
| align="left"| || align="center"| PG
| 4 || 0 || 42 || 2 || 1 || 2 || 0 || 9
|-
| align="left"| || align="center"| SG
| 2 || 0 || 17 || 3 || 2 || 0 || 0 || 6
|-
| align="left"| || align="center"| SG
| 73 || 0 || 1,258 || 137 || 117 || 37 || 19 || 653
|-
| align="left"| || align="center"| PG
| 56 || 0 || 1,003 || 83 || 207 || 21 || 7 || 530
|-
| align="left"| || align="center"| PG
| style=";"|82 || style=";"|82 || style=";"|2,863 || 361 || style=";"|484 || style=";"|102 || 34 || style=";"|2,102
|-
| align="left"| || align="center"| PF
| 75 || 75 || 2,133 || 407 || 92 || 71 || style=";"|61 || 756
|-
| align="left"| || align="center"| C
| 49 || 47 || 1,243 || 333 || 102 || 38 || 41 || 497
|}
After all games.

Transactions

Trades

Free agents

Additions

Subtractions

References

Charlotte Hornets seasons
Charlotte Hornets
Charlotte Hornets
Charlotte Hornets